Joseph Williams (April 6, 1886 – February 25, 1951), nicknamed "Cyclone Joe" and "Smokey Joe", was an American right-handed pitcher in Negro league baseball.  He is considered one of the greatest pitchers of all-time and was elected to the National Baseball Hall of Fame in 1999.

Baseball career
Williams was born in Seguin, Texas. One of his parents was African American, and the other was a Comanche Native American. Williams grew up to become an outstanding pitcher, but as his path to the major leagues was barred by the color line, he spent his entire 27-year career (1905–1932) pitching in the Negro leagues, Mexico, and the Caribbean.

Williams entered professional baseball in 1905 with the San Antonio Black Bronchos and was an immediate star, posting records of 28-4, 15-9, 20-8, 20-2, and 32-8. After that, the Chicago Giants, a team higher in the pecking order of black baseball, acquired him. In 1910, the Giants owner Frank Leland pronounced him the best pitcher in baseball, in any league.

In 1911, Williams joined the Lincoln Giants of New York, helping that club become one of the premier African-American teams of the era. In 1913, he took part in a "Championship Series" that matched up them against the team considered the best of the West in the Chicago American Giants. From July 18 to August 13, the two teams played fourteen games with each other. He had a decision in Games 1, 3, 4, 5, 8, 10, 11, winning five of the eight appearances as the Lincoln Giants won eight of fourteen games in the Series. In Game 5, he hit a home run.  When manager John Henry Lloyd departed in 1914, Williams took over as player-manager, a post he held through the 1923 season. After the Lincolns finished an ignominious fifth (out of six teams) in the Eastern Colored League's inaugural season, Williams was released in the spring of 1924.

Williams joined the Brooklyn Royal Giants for a season, then signed with the independent Homestead Grays, where, except for a brief turn with the Detroit Wolves in 1932, he spent the rest of his career in top-level black baseball. In 1929, playing for the Grays in the American Negro League at the age of 43, Williams won 12 games and lost seven.

On August 2, 1930, at age 44, Williams struck out 27 Kansas City Monarchs in a 1–0, 12-inning, one-hit night game victory.  His mound opponent, Chet Brewer, struck out 19 men. That same year, he beat a younger Negro league star who was just bursting into superstardom, Satchel Paige, also by 1–0, in their only meeting against each other. Williams retired from baseball two years later.

Although barred from the major leagues, Williams pitched many games against major league stars in postseason barnstorming exhibitions. He proved to be as tough against them as he was against the Negro leaguers, posting a 20-7 record in these games. Among his victims were Hall of Famers Grover Cleveland Alexander, Walter Johnson, Chief Bender, Rube Marquard, and Waite Hoyt. Three different times, he faced the eventual National League champions. He won two of those games and lost the third, 1-0 to the 1917 New York Giants despite throwing a no-hitter.

During Williams' years in New York, he acquired the nickname "Cyclone Joe", or simply "Cyclone", frequently being listed in box scores solely by that name.  After joining the Homestead Grays in the late 1920s, his nickname became "Smokey Joe", and the older "Cyclone" appellation was rarely used after that.

Williams played winter baseball with a Palm Beach, Florida team for more than 20 years during his active career.

Family
Williams married Beatrice A. Johnson on March 22, 1922 in New York City. Upon retiring from baseball in the late 1930s, Williams became a bartender and continued this until his death from a heart ailment. Beatrice Williams survived him.

Williams is interned at Lincoln Memorial Cemetery, a historic African American cemetery in Suitland, Maryland. He is buried in a grave shared with his wife's mother and step-father.

Legacy
In 1950, there was a "Smokey Joe Williams Day" at the Polo Grounds. The following year, Williams died at age 64 in New York City.

Considerable debate existed and still exists over whether Williams or Paige was the greatest of the Negro league pitchers. Most modern sources lean toward Paige, but in 1952, a poll taken by the Pittsburgh Courier named Williams the greatest pitcher in Negro league history.

In 1999, after extensive research on the early years of black baseball revealed his outstanding record, Williams was elected to the National Baseball Hall of Fame. In the 2001 book The New Bill James Historical Baseball Abstract, writer Bill James ranked Williams as the 52nd greatest player in baseball history, behind Sandy Koufax and ahead of Roy Campanella. This would rank Williams as the 12th greatest pitcher, behind Koufax and ahead of Bob Feller.

References

Further reading

External links

 and Baseball-Reference Black Baseball stats and Seamheads
  and Seamheads

1886 births
1951 deaths
National Baseball Hall of Fame inductees
Baseball pitchers
Bacharach Giants players
Brooklyn Royal Giants players
Chicago American Giants players
Chicago Giants players
Detroit Wolves players
Hilldale Club players
Homestead Grays players
Lincoln Giants players
San Antonio Black Bronchos players
Schenectady Mohawk Giants players
Club Fé players
Habana players
People from Seguin, Texas
Baseball players from San Antonio
American expatriate baseball players in Cuba